Behind the Gare Saint-Lazare is a black and white photograph taken by French photographer Henri Cartier-Bresson in Paris in 1932. The picture has variable dimensions, according to the different prints, being one of them of 44,8 by 29,8 cm. It is one of his best known and more critically acclaimed photographs and became iconic of his style that attempted to capture the decisive moment in photography. The photograph was considered one of the 100 most influential pictures of all time by Time magazine.

History and description
The spontaneous photograph was taken by Cartier-Bresson at the Place de l'Europe, outside the Saint-Lazare train station, in Paris, with his portable Leica camera. In this case, he took aim to a man who leaps over a wet ground, without touching it, while his shadow is reflected beneath him, near a fallen stair. Behind him posters in a wall advertise dancers, that seems to echo the man's movement, and the Railowski Circus. The man is forever framed in the air, without touching the water. This was one of the few photographs that the artist cropped. Cartier-Bresson explained that "There was a plank fence around some repairs behind the Gare [Saint] Lazare, and I was peeking through the spaces with my camera eye. This is what I saw. The space between the planks was not entirely wide enough for my lens, which is the reason the picture is cut off on the left."

Art market
A print of the photograph sold at Christie's on November 17, 2011 by $590,455, then the highest price for an work by the artist.

Public collections
There are prints of this photograph at several public collections, including the Henri Cartier-Bresson Foundation, in Paris, the Musée National d'Art Moderne, in Paris, the Museum of Modern Art, in New York, the International Center of Photography, in New York, the Minneapolis Institute of Art, and the San Francisco Museum of Modern Art.

See also
 List of photographs considered the most important

References

1932 in art
Black-and-white photographs
1930s photographs
Photographs by Henri Cartier-Bresson
Photographs in the collection of the Musée National d'Art Moderne
Photographs of the Museum of Modern Art (New York City)
Photographs of the San Francisco Museum of Modern Art